The 1966–67 Women's Handball European Cup was the seventh edition of the international competition for European women's handball national champion clubs, taking place from December 1966 to 2 April 1967.

The title holder, SC Leipzig reached once again the final of the competition, but was defeated in the final by Žalgiris Kaunas. This victory meant the beginning of the soviet domination, until the collapse of the USSR.

Qualifying stage

Quarter-finals

Semi-finals

Final

References

European Cup women
European Cup women
Women's EHF Champions League
Eur
Eur